George Banks may refer to:

 George Linnaeus Banks (1821–1881), British author
 George L. Banks (soldier) (1839–1924), American soldier and Medal of Honor recipient
 George Banks (rugby league) ( – death unknown), English rugby league player in the 1930s and 1940s
 George Banks (footballer) (1919–1991), English footballer
 George Banks, aka Pushkal Bahadur Budaprithi, Gurkha musician, bagpiper, father of Indian jazz musician Louis Banks
 George Banks (baseball) (1938–1985), American baseball player in the 1960s
 George Banks (born 1942), mass murderer, convicted of the 1982 Wilkes-Barre shootings
 George Banks (basketball) (born 1972), American professional basketball player from 1995 to 2010

Fictional characters
 George Banks (Mary Poppins), one of the main characters in Mary Poppins
 George Stanley Banks, the protagonist/narrator in the films Father of the Bride and Father of the Bride Part II

See also
 George Bankes (1788–1856), MP for Corfe Castle and Dorset
 George Bank (disambiguation)
 Tony Banks (musician) (Anthony George Banks)